"Woman" is a song recorded by American singer Kesha and featuring the Dap-Kings Horns for her third studio album Rainbow (2017). It was released as the first promotional single from the album on July 13, 2017. The song was then released as the third single from the album on January 22, 2018.

Background and composition
In an essay for Rolling Stone, Kesha wrote:

Later, Kesha revealed the real purpose of releasing the song - to protest Donald Trump in offense to his "pussy grabbing comment," according to her interview with Metro.co.uk. In another interview with Rolling Stone, she stated, "I just really love being a woman and I wanted an anthem for anyone else who wants to yell about being self-sufficient and strong." Along with releasing the music video, she also released an essay detailing her intentions of writing the song and releasing it early from her album.

The song is performed in the key of F minor with a tempo of 115 beats per minute.

Critical reception
Critics and fans alike praised the song. Rolling Stone called the song "funk-laden", while Business Insider identified the song as "funk-filled pop." USA Today hailed the song as "the feminist song of the summer".

Commercial performance
"Woman" debuted at number 96 on the US Billboard Hot 100 for the week ending August 5, 2017, selling 19,000 copies in the United States according to Nielsen Soundscan. Thanks to an array of dance remixes,  "Woman" topped the Dance Club Songs chart on the issue dated December 23, 2017, becoming Kesha's third number one on that chart, and her first since "Timber" in 2014. As of December 13, 2018, "Woman" received a gold certification in the United States by the nation's RIAA (Recording Industry Association of America) for accomplishing sales and streaming figures of 500,000 units in the country alone.

Music video
The music video for the song was released on July 13, 2017.

Live performances
The song was part of the setlist of Kesha's Rainbow Tour. She performed the song on Good Morning America, where she also performed "Praying". Kesha also performed the song at numerous iHeart Radio festivals. On January 22, 2018, Kesha released the official live version, which was recorded during her Rainbow Tour.

Usage in media
This song was included at the end of the 2017 Christmas Comedy film A Bad Moms Christmas. This song was also featured in the 2020 DC Extended Universe film Birds of Prey with Kesha praising the usage of her song.

Track listing
Digital download and streaming
 "Woman" – 3:16

Digital download and streaming (Remixes)
 "Woman" (Dave Audé Remix) – 3:25
 "Woman" (Rare Candy Remix) – 2:59
 "Woman" (Tobtok Remix) – 3:08

Charts

Weekly charts

Year-end charts

Certifications

Release history

References

2017 songs
2018 singles
Kesha songs
Songs written by Drew Pearson (songwriter)
Songs written by Kesha
Songs written by Wrabel
Songs with feminist themes
Funk songs
Kemosabe Records singles
RCA Records singles
Songs about Donald Trump